The Orchestral Album is an album by American pianist Dave Grusin released in 1994, recorded for GRP Records. It contains both original recordings and new arrangements of previously released material. The arrangement of Three Cowboy Songs won the 1995 Grammy Award for Best Instrumental Arrangement.

The Orchestral Album reached No. 10 on Billboard's Jazz chart.

Track listing
All tracks written by Dave Grusin; except where noted
"Cuba Libre" (from Havana) - 3:30
"Santa Clara Suite: Vayase" (from Havana) - 1:26
"Santa Clara Suite: Miliocia Y Refugios" (from Havana) - 1:45
"Santa Clara Suite Fuego Peligroso" (from Havana) - 0:59
"Santa Clara Suite: Epilogue" (from Havana) - 0:54
"Git Along, Little Doggies" - 4:38
"The Colorado Trail" - 5:03
"Cripple Creek Breakdown" - 5:01
Medely: "Bess You is My Woman/I Loves You Porgy" (George Gershwin, Ira Gershwin) - 5:50
"Lupita" - 1:09
"Coyote Angel" - 3:29
"Pistolero" - 1:47
"Milagro" - 2:36
"Fiesta" - 2:26
"The Heart is a Lonely Hunter" - 4:45
"Summer Sketches" - 12:34
"Condor" (theme from Three Days of the Condor) - 4:43

Personnel
Dave Grusin - Acoustic Piano, Synthesizer, Conductor
Lee Ritenour - Guitar
Eric Gale - Guitar
Abraham Laboriel - Bass
John Pattitucci - Bass
Harvey Mason - Drums
Steve Gadd - Drums
Rubens Bassini - Percussion
Mike Fisher - Percussion
Tom Scott - Saxophone
Ernie Watts - Saxophone
George Young - Saxophone
Tiger Okoshi - Trumpet
Arturo Sandoval - Trumpet
Dave Valentin - Flute
Don Grusin - Synthesizers

Charts

References

External links
Dave Grusin-The Orchestral Album at Discogs
Dave Grusin-The orchestral album at AllMusic

1994 albums
GRP Records albums
Dave Grusin albums